The Good Law Project is a United Kingdom-based political non-profit company. Founded by Jolyon Maugham, the Good Law Project states that its mission is to achieve change through the law.

History
The Good Law Project was founded in January 2017 as a company limited by guarantee under English law headed by Maugham. It is a non-profit but not a registered charity. In 2019 it launched a crowdfunded challenge to the prorogation of parliament by Boris Johnson's Conservative government, which was ultimately successful. The prorogation was ruled unlawful by the Supreme Court, but by this time Johnson's government had pushed through their Brexit deal so the issue was moot. However, the £200,000 raised enabled Good Law Project to hire more staff and launch other fundraisers to take on more cases.

As of September 2021 Good Law Project has applied for Judicial Review in 14 cases and been granted approval in 11.

In 2022, the High Court ruled that the Good Law Project does not have 'carte blanche' for bringing in judicial reviews.

Cases

Abingdon Health

The Good Law Project challenged the Secretary for Health and Social Care, claiming that the COVID testing contracts with Abingdon Health were unlawful because they were not advertised nor open to competition, and the correct procurement process was bypassed. On 7 October 2022 the High Court ruled that the contracts were lawful, so Good Law Project lost the case.

LGB Alliance
In September 2022, the charity Mermaids went to court to appeal the Charity Commission's decision to grant LGB Alliance charitable status. This action was supported by the Good Law Project.

References

External links

British political websites